Stefán Örn Sigurðsson (born 20 February 1954) is an Icelandic former football player and former member of the Icelandic men's national football team.

Club career
After playing for KR since 1972, Stefán Örn signed with Holbæk B&I in August 1978. He returned to KR in 1979. After the 1983 season, Stefán Örn moved to the United States to attend Davis & Elkins College where he also played football.

National team career
In September 1978, Stefán was selected to the Icelandic national football team for the first time ahead of its game against East Germany. He started in Iceland's 3–1 loss.

Personal life
Stefán Örn is the father of Icelandic ice hockey player Robbie Sigurðsson.

See also
List of Iceland international footballers

References

External links

Sigurdsson, Stefan Orn
Sigurdsson, Stefan Orn
Icelandic footballers
Iceland international footballers
Knattspyrnufélag Reykjavíkur players
Sigurdsson, Stefan Orn
Holbæk B&I players
Icelandic expatriate footballers
Sigurdsson, Stefan Orn
Icelandic expatriate sportspeople in Denmark
Icelandic expatriate sportspeople in the United States
Expatriate soccer players in the United States
Icelandic emigrants to the United States